John Gibbon (1827–1896) was United States Army officer who fought in the American Civil War.

John Gibbon may also refer to:

 John Gibbon (judge) (1528–1595), judge and MP for Hindon (UK Parliament constituency), 1558
 John Gibbon (officer of arms) (1629–1718), English Bluemantle Pursuivant and writer on heraldry
 John Gibbon (British Army officer) (1917–1997)
 John Gibbon (psychologist) (1934–2001), Professor of psychology, son of John Heysham Gibbon
 John Heysham Gibbon (1903–1973), inventor of the heart-lung machine
 John Murray Gibbon (1875–1952), Scottish-Canadian writer
 John Gibbon (MP for Derby), represented Derby (UK Parliament constituency)
 John Gibbon (cricketer) (1847–1883), English cricketer and clergyman

See also
John Gibbons (disambiguation)